This is a list of spouses of national leaders born abroad. Spouses or partners using the title of “First lady” or “First gentleman” of a nation are included, whether they be a spouse of a president, prime minister, or other national leader. Some countries which have a president and prime minister have only included the spouse considered that of the national leader.

Spouses are not included if they were born in a colony that would become an independent state (ex. New Spain forming independent nations in Latin America), countries that changed names (Upper Volta to Burkina Faso), or countries that broke apart (spouses of former Soviet countries born in another Soviet republic). Regal consorts and spouses of viceregal representatives (governors-general) are not included.

References 

 
First Lady